The 2012 AFF Championship, sponsored by Suzuki and officially known as the 2012 AFF Suzuki Cup, was the 9th edition of the AFF Championship, the football championship of Southeast Asia. It was co-hosted for group stage by Malaysia and Thailand and took place from 24 November to 22 December 2012.

Malaysia were the defending champions, but were eliminated by Thailand in the semi-finals. Singapore became the first side to win the AFF Championship four times, beating Thailand 3–2 on aggregate in the finals. Singapore coach Radojko Avramović also became the most successful coach in tournament history, adding to his wins in 2004 and 2007.

Hosts
On 17 December 2010, the Philippine Football Federation declared their interest to host the 2012 AFF Championship.  However, with no other reported interest and following the meeting of the AFF Council on 19 February 2011, Malaysia and Thailand were announced as hosts of the group stage.

Venues
There were two main venues; the Bukit Jalil National Stadium in Kuala Lumpur and the Rajamangala Stadium in Bangkok. The secondary venues; the Shah Alam Stadium in Shah Alam, Selangor State and the Supachalasai Stadium in Bangkok for the final round of group games on 30 November and 1 December. The Supachalasai Stadium replaced the Muang Thong Stadium as the alternative venue for the final match day in Group A on 27 November, after itself had been replaced by the Muang Thong Stadium on 17 October. If Thailand reached the semifinals and finals, their home games were played at the Supachalasai Stadium as the Rajamangala was hosting the 2012 Race of Champions.
Philippines and Singapore also hosted games due to making the knockout stages. The Philippines hosted at the Rizal Memorial Stadium in Manila, the first time an AFF Championship game was held in the Philippines and Singapore hosted at the Jalan Besar Stadium.

Qualification

Qualification took place from 5 to 13 October 2012. It involved the five lower ranked teams in Southeast Asia. All teams played in a round-robin tournament format with the top two teams qualifying for the tournament proper. Six teams have qualified directly to the finals.

Draw
The draw for the tournament as well as the qualification tournament took place on the afternoon of 11 July 2012 at the Golden Tulip Hotel in Bangkok. The teams that qualified via the qualifying stages were not yet determined at the time of the draw.  The eight finalists were divided into four pots of two teams each based on team rankings.

Squads

Final tournament

Group stage

Tie-breaking criteria
Ranking in each group shall be determine as follows:
 Greater number of points obtained in all the group matches;
 Goal difference in all the group matches;
 Greater number of goals scored in all the group matches.
If two or more teams are equal on the basis on the above three criteria, the place shall be determined as follows:
 Result of the direct match between the teams concerned;
 Drawing lots by the Organising Committee.
However, these criteria would not apply if two teams tied on points, goals scored, and conceded played against each other in their final group match, are still level at the end of that match, and no other team in group finishes with same points; in that case, the tie would be broken by a penalty shootout.

Group A

 All matches were played in Thailand.
 Times listed are UTC+7.

Group B

 All matches were played in Malaysia.
 Times listed are UTC+8.

Knockout stage

Semifinals
First Leg

Second Leg

Singapore won 1–0 on aggregate.

Thailand won 3–1 on aggregate.

Final

First leg

Second leg

Singapore won 3–2 on aggregate.

Awards

Player statistics

Discipline
In the final tournament, a player was suspended for the subsequent match in the competition for either getting red card or accumulating two yellow cards in two different matches.

Player who get a card during the semifinals and final doesn't include here.

Goalscorers
5 goals
  Teerasil Dangda

4 goals
  Shahril Ishak

3 goals

  Khampheng Sayavutthi
  Khairul Amri
  Kirati Keawsombat

2 goals
  Keoviengphet Liththideth

1 goal

  Andik Vermansyah
  Raphael Maitimo
  Vendry Mofu
  Khonesavanh Sihavong
  Azamuddin Akil
  Khyril Muhymeen
  Mahali Jasuli
  Norshahrul Idlan
  Safee Sali
  Safiq Rahim
  Wan Zack Haikal
  Kyi Lin
  Emelio Caligdong
  Ángel Guirado
  Paul Mulders
  Phil Younghusband
  Aleksandar Đurić
  Baihakki Khaizan
  Fahrudin Mustafić
  Fazrul Nawaz
  Adul Lahsoh
  Anucha Kitpongsri
  Apipoo Suntornpanavej
  Jakkraphan Pornsai
  Theerathon Bunmathan
  Lê Tấn Tài
  Nguyễn Văn Quyết

Own goal
  Nguyễn Gia Từ (playing against Thailand)

Team statistics
This table shows all team performance.

Media coverage

References

External links
 AFF Suzuki Cup official website
 ASEAN Football Federation official website

 
AFF Championship tournaments
AFF Championship
AFF Championship
AFF Championship
2012 AFF Suzuki Cup
2012 AFF Suzuki Cup